Judith Anne LaRocque, was a senior Canadian civil servant.  Most notably, she served as Secretary to the Governor General of Canada and Herald Chancellor of Canada from 1990 until 2000.  Since 2010, she has been Canada's Ambassador and Permanent Representative at the Organisation for Economic Co-operation and Development in Paris. She died on December 29, 2021.

Education

LaRocque received an Honours Bachelor of Arts degree in political science from Carleton University in 1979.  She received a Master of Arts degree in Public Administration from the same university in 1992.

Career

In 1979, LaRocque began her career as an Administrative Assistant with the Public Service Commission of Canada.  Shortly afterwards, she became a Writer and Researcher at the Prime Minister's Office.  From 1980 until 1982, she was a Special Assistant at the Office of the Leader of the Opposition.

In 1982, she became a Procedural Officer and Committee Clerk at the House of Commons, a position she held until 1984.  From 1984 until 1985, she served as Legislative Assistant to the Government House Leader.  She then dealt with House Affairs at the Office of the President of the Queen's Privy Council for Canada until 1986.

From 1986 until 1989, she served as the Executive Assistant to the Minister of Justice and Attorney General for Canada.  In 1989, she became Chief of Staff to the Leader of the Government in the Senate and Minister of State for Federal-Provincial Relations, a position she held until her appointment as Secretary to the Governor General of Canada and Herald Chancellor of Canada in 1990.

Upon the completion of her term as Secretary to the Governor General in 2000, LaRocque was appointed Associate Deputy Minister at the Department of Canadian Heritage.  She was promoted to the position of Deputy Minister at the Department in 2002, a position she held until her diplomatic appointment to the OECD in 2010.

References

External links

 (http://www.salonfuneraireberthiaume.com/Funerailles/Fiche/4714/Judith%20LaRocque)
 "Changes in the senior ranks of the Public Service"
 "Carleton Alumni - Judith Anne LaRocque"

Canadian civil servants
Carleton University alumni
Canadian Commanders of the Royal Victorian Order
Living people
Year of birth missing (living people)